The 1985 Cork Junior A Hurling Championship was the 88th staging of the Cork Junior A Hurling Championship since its establishment by the Cork County Board. The championship ran from 22 September to 27 October 1985.

On 27 October 1985, Kilbrittain won the championship following a 5–07 to 1–12 defeat of Cobh in the final at Páirc Uí Chaoimh. It remains their only championship title.

References

1985 in hurling
Cork Junior Hurling Championship